Stephie is a feminine given name. Notable people with the name include:

 Sassy Stephie (born 1984), American professional wrestler
 Stephie D'Souza (1936–1998), Indian sportsperson
 Stephie Coplan (born 1987), American singer-songwriter of Stephie Coplan & The Pedestrians 

Feminine given names